Clearwater or Clear Water may refer to:

Places

Canada
 Clear Water Academy, a private Catholic school located in Calgary, Alberta
 Clearwater (provincial electoral district), a former provincial electoral district in Alberta
 Clearwater, British Columbia
 Clearwater, Manitoba
 Clearwater County, Alberta
 Clearwater Lakes, a double impact crater in Quebec

Hong Kong
 Clear Water Bay

United States
 Clearwater, Florida
 Clearwater, Kansas
 Clearwater, Minnesota
 Clearwater, Missouri
 Clearwater, Nebraska
 Clearwater, Oregon
 Clearwater, South Carolina
 Clearwater, Washington
 Clearwater County, Idaho
 Clearwater County, Minnesota
 Clearwater Township, Michigan
 Clearwater Township, Minnesota
 Clearwater Township, Nebraska
 Clearwater Mountains, in the panhandle of Idaho

Other
 Clearwater Bay Golf & Country Club, a country club in Hong Kong
 Clearwater Features, a production company which did Thomas the Tank Engine & Friends in its very early years
 Clearwater Festival, a folk music festival whose proceeds benefit Hudson River Sloop Clearwater
 Clearwater, the sloop which this Hudson River non-profit corporation is named after
 Clearwater Marine Aquarium, a 501c non-profit organization and aquarium in Clearwater, Florida
 Clearwater Paper Corporation, a pulp and paperboard manufacturer
 Clearwater Threshers, a minor-league baseball team affiliated with the Philadelphia Phillies
 Creedence Clearwater Revival, an American rock band from the late 1960s
 The Clearwater Concert, a 2009 benefit concert at Madison Square Garden in New York City in celebration of Pete Seeger's 90th birthday
 The Clearwater Resort, a golf course in New Zealand

People with the surname
William H. Clearwater (1875–1948), billiards champion

See also
 Clearwater Lake (disambiguation)
 Clearwater River (disambiguation)
 Eau Claire (disambiguation), French for Clearwater
 Shimizu (disambiguation), Japanese for Clearwater
 Qingshui (disambiguation), Chinese for Clearwater